"Angel Eyes (Home and Away)" is the third single from Scottish band Wet Wet Wet's first album, Popped In Souled Out (1987). It was released in November 1987. The lyrics in the chorus make reference to two Hal David and Burt Bacharach compositions "Walk On By" and "The Look of Love", and quote an entire verse of the Squeeze single "Heartbreaking World". Some later issues of this single (including all of the US issues) accordingly credit the Squeeze lyricist Chris Difford as a co-author.

"Angel Eyes" reached number five in the UK Singles Chart in January 1988 and also peaked at number nine in Ireland. Later in the year, the song charted in other countries, becoming a top-five hit in Belgium, the Netherlands, and New Zealand. Marti Pellow recorded his own version of the song for inclusion on his 2002 album Marti Pellow Sings the Hits of Wet Wet Wet & Smile. An earlier version of the song, entitled "Home and Away", was on the 1986 Glasgow band's compilation cassette Honey at the Core.

Track listings
CD:
 "Angel Eyes (Home and Away)" (full length version)
 "We Can Love"
 "Angel Eyes (Home and Away)" (original demo version)
 "Angel Eyes (Home and Away)" (7-inch version)

MC:
 "Angel Eyes (Home and Away)"
 "We Can Love"
 "Home & Away"
 "Angel Eyes" (extended version)

7-inch:
 "Angel Eyes (Home and Away)"
 "We Can Love"

12-inch:
 "Angel Eyes (Home and Away)"
 "We Can Love"
 "Home & Away"

Charts

Weekly charts

Year-end charts

Certifications

References

Wet Wet Wet songs
1987 singles
1987 songs
Pop ballads
Mercury Records singles
Songs written by Chris Difford
Songs written by Graeme Clark (musician)
Songs written by Marti Pellow
Songs written by Neil Mitchell (musician)
Songs written by Tommy Cunningham